Eglinton Cricket Club is a cricket club in Eglinton, County Londonderry, Northern Ireland, playing in the North West Premier League.

The club was founded in 1936.

Honours
North West Senior League: 3
1956, 1970, 1972
North West Senior Cup: 9
1944, 1948, 1953, 1954, 1956, 1968, 1990, 1995, 2006

References

External links
Eglinton Cricket Club

Cricket clubs in County Londonderry
North West Senior League members
1936 establishments in Northern Ireland
Cricket clubs in Northern Ireland